Discography for the experimental music group Coil and their aliases.

Albums attributed solely to Coil
 Scatology (LP/cassette/CD) (1985)
 Horse Rotorvator (LP/cassette/CD) (1986)
 Gold Is the Metal (With the Broadest Shoulders) (LP/CD) (1987)
 Love's Secret Domain (LP/cassette/CD) (1991 July)
 Stolen & Contaminated Songs (CD) (1992)
 Astral Disaster (LP/CD) (1999 January/2000 January)
 Musick to Play in the Dark Vol. 1 (CD/LP) (1999 September)
 Queens of the Circulating Library (CD) (2000 April)
 Musick to Play in the Dark Vol. 2 (CD/2×LP) (2000 September)
 Constant Shallowness Leads to Evil (CD) (2000 September)
 The Remote Viewer (CD-R/2×CD) (2002 April)
 ANS (CD) (2003 May)
 Black Antlers (CD-R/2×CD) (2004 May)
 The Ape of Naples (CD/3×LP) (2 December 2005)
 The New Backwards (CD/LP) (2008)

Extended plays
 How to Destroy Angels (12″) (1984)
 The Unreleased Themes for Hellraiser (10″/cassette/CD) (1987)
The Solstice and Equinox series
 Spring Equinox: Moon's Milk or Under an Unquiet Skull (7″/CD) (1998 March)
 Summer Solstice: Bee Stings (7″/CD) (1998 June)
 Autumn Equinox: Amethyst Deceivers (7″/CD) (1998 September)
 Winter Solstice: North (7″/CD) (1999 January)

Singles
 "Panic/Tainted Love" (12″/CD) (1985)
 "The Anal Staircase" (12″) (1986)
 "The Wheel / The Wheal" (7″) (1987)
 "The Wheal / Keelhauler" (7″) (1987)
 "Wrong Eye/Scope" (7″) (1990)
 "Windowpane" (12″/CD) (1990)
 "The Snow" (12″/cassette/CD) (1991)
 "Airborne Bells/Is Suicide a Solution?" (7″) (1993 November)
 "Themes for Derek Jarman's Blue" (7″) (1993)
 "Animal Are You?" (box set) (2006 December)

Live albums
 Coil Presents Time Machines (CD) (2000 September)
 Live Four (CD) (2003 March)
 Live Three (CD) (2003 March)
 Live Two (CD) (2003 May)
 Live One (2×CD) (2003 June)
 Megalithomania! (CD-R) (2003 July)
 Selvaggina, Go Back into the Woods (CD-R) (2004 July)
 ...And the Ambulance Died in His Arms (CD) (2005 April)

Compilation albums
 Unnatural History (CD) (1990)
 Unnatural History II (CD) (1995 January)
 Windowpane & the Snow (CD) (1995)
 Unnatural History III (CD) (1997 June)
 A Guide for Beginners: The Voice of Silver (CD) (2001 September)
 A Guide for Finishers: Golden Hair (CD) (2001 September)
 Moon's Milk (In Four Phases) (2×CD) (2002 January)
 The Golden Hare with a Voice of Silver (2×CD) (2002)
 The Key to Joy Is Disobedience (box set) (2003 July)

Aliases and side-project releases
 Zos Kia / Coil – Transparent (cassette/CD/LP) (1984)
 Vortex Campaign / Coil / The New Blockaders – Dolbied (cassette) (1984)
 Sickness of Snakes – Nightmare Culture (12″) (1985)
 Coil vs The Eskaton – Nasa-Arab (12″) (1994)
 Coil vs ELpH – Born Again Pagans (CD) (1994)
 ELpH – pHILM #1 (10″) (1994)
 ELpH vs. Coil – Worship the Glitch (CD/2×10″) (1995)
 Black Light District – A Thousand Lights in a Darkened Room (CD/2×LP) (1996)
 Time Machines – Time Machines (CD/2×LP/2×CD) (1998/2001/2007)
 ELpH – elph.zwölf (CD) (1999)

Other releases
 How to Destroy Angels (Remixes and Re-Recordings) (CD) (1992)
 The Angelic Conversation (CD) (1994)
 Songs of the Week (download series) (1998–99)
 The Remote Viewer (CD-R/2×CD) (2002 May)
 Spoiler Talks DVD Series: Coil (DVD) (2003)
 Moons Milk (In Four Phases) Bonus Disc (CD-R) (2003 July)
 Colour Sound Oblivion (16×DVD) (2010)

New material released after the death of Peter Christopherson 
 Uncoiled, remixes of Nine Inch Nails (digital) (2012 November 4)
 Recoiled, remixes of Nine Inch Nails (CD/LP) (2014 February 24)
 Expansión Naranja (12″) (2015 June)
 The Angelic Conversation (Instrumental) (CD) (2015 October 9)
 Panic (CD) (2015 October 9)
 The Wheel (CD) (2015 October 9)
 The Anal Staircase (CD) (2015 October 9)
 The Consequences of Raising Hell (CD) (2015 October 9)
 Wrong Eye (CD) (2015 October 9)
 Windowpane (CD) (2015 October 9)
 The Snow (CD) (2015 October 9)
 Backwards (CD/LP) (2015 October 29)
 A Cold Cell in Bangkok (12″) (2017 August)
 Another Brown World / Baby Food (12″) (2017 September)
 Astral Disaster Sessions Un/Finished Musics (CD/LP) (2018 February 7)
 How to Destroy Angels, live and rehearsal (CD/LP) (2018 August 3)
 Live Five – Gdańsk Autumn 2002 (CD-R) (2019 April 19)
 Airborne Bells (CD) (2019 May 15)
 The Sound of Musick (CD) (2019 May 15)
 First Dark Ride (CD) (2019 May 15)
 Protection (CD) (2019 May 15)
 Heartworms (CD) (2019 May 15)
 I Don't Want to Be the One (CD) (2019 May 15)
 Copal (CD) (2019 May 15)
 The Restitution of Decayed Intelligence (CD) (2019 May 15)
 Swanyard (3×LP/2×CD) (2019 May 25)
 The Gay Man's Guide to Safer Sex + 2 (CD/LP) (2019 June 28)
 Live – Copenhagen 2002 (digital) (2019 July 28)
 A Prison of Measured Time (CD/12″) (2020 February)
 Astral Disaster Sessions Un/finished Musics Vol. 2 (LP) (2020 July 25)
 Sara Dale's Sensual Massage (CD/2×LP/digital) (2020 September 23)
 Live – Limoges 2002 (digital) (2022 July 31)
 Live – Lódz 2002 (digital) (2022 October 19)
 Persistence Is All: Live at Royal Festival Hall (CD) (2022 11 13)

Compilation appearances

Mixes, remixes & production by Coil

Remixes of Coil by others
The album Pontifex Maximus by Phallus Dei includes a track called "Rule Again". The music for this track is credited to Coil and lyrics to Death in June, however it is merely the song "Here to Here" with the lyrics of the Death in June song "Rule Again" sung over top of the track. This track was neither authorized by Coil or Death in June. (1991)
The album Pure by The Golden Palominos features a song called "No Skin" which samples "Nasa Arab" heavily. (1994)
The album No Thought, No Breath, No Eyes, No Heart (Pure Mixes) by The Golden Palominos includes several versions of the song "No Skin" which heavily features "Nasa Arab". One of these tracks was included as part of the Songs of the Week series. (1995)
The single Obsidian Monarch by Thread is a two track 7″ vinyl with a remix of "Glowworm/Waveform" and "Dark River". (1999)
The album Москве by CoH features a remix of the ELpH vs. Coil track "pHILM". (2002)

Music videos

References 

 Coil at Brainwashed

External links
 Coil at Brainwashed
 
 

Discographies of British artists
Electronic music discographies
Coil (band)